Singoalla is a 1940 opera in four acts by Gunnar de Frumerie to a libretto by  (1889–1969) based on the novel with the English title The Wind Is My Lover by Swedish author Viktor Rydberg. The opera premiered on 16 March at the Royal Swedish Opera, Stockholm.

Plot
The opera is set in Sweden during the fourteenth century. The plot centres on Singoalla, princess of a nomadic tribe and Erland, a young knight with whom she has a son. In acts 1 and 2 the tribe take him hostage in order to escape with items stolen from a monastery. The tribe give Erland a potion causing him to forget Singoalla and abandon her. Acts 3 and 4 resume the story after ten years have passed and Erland is now married to another woman but tormented by strange dreams in which child predicts the coming of the Black Death. At this point the child, his forgotten son, enters the plot and his service, leading to the death of the principal characters.

Recording
Anne Sofie von Otter as Singoalla (mezzo-soprano); Björn Haugan as Erland Månesköld (tenor); Per-Arne Wahlgren as Assim and as Riddar Bengt Månesköld (baritone);  as Helena Ulvsax (mezzo-soprano); Erik Saedén as Pater Henrik (bass);  as Broder Johannes (tenor); Stig Tysklind as Hövdingen [chief of the wandering people] (bass); Inger Blom as Assim's Mother (contralto); Lasse Bergström as Sorgbarn (boy soprano); Royal Stockholm Philharmonic Orchestra, Yuri Ahronovitch  1988 Caprice CAP22023

References

External links
"Frumerie: Singoalla, review by Robert Layton in Gramophone, December 1988

1940 operas
Swedish-language operas
Operas set in Sweden
Operas set in the 14th century
Operas based on novels
Operas